Salad Days: A Decade of Punk in Washington, DC (1980–90) is a documentary written and directed by Scott Crawford. Released on December 19, 2014, the Kickstarter-funded film features early pioneers of the Washington, DC hardcore punk music scene over a decade (1980-1990) including Minor Threat, Fugazi, Bad Brains, Government Issue, Youth Brigade, Teen Idles, Rites of Spring, and others.

Synopsis
This documentary film addresses the growth and the social, cultural and political aspects that influenced the hardcore punk music scene in Washington, DC. The film features numerous footage shot and photos of the hardcore movement.  It features interviews with early hardcore punk music artists from bands and many more.

Interviewees
The interviewees are (in order of appearance):
Ian Mackaye of Fugazi, formerly of The Teen Idles, Minor Threat and co-founder of Dischord Records
Henry Rollins of Rollins Band, formerly of Black Flag and State of Alert
Mark Sullivan formerly of Kingface
Sab Grey of Iron Cross
Bert Queiroz formerly of Untouchables, Youth Brigade and Second Wind
Thurston Moore of Sonic Youth
Alec MacKaye formerly of Untouchables, The Faith, and Ignition
Dante Ferrando formerly of Iron Cross, Ignition and Gray Matter
Danny Ingram formerly of Youth Brigade, Madhouse and Strange Boutique
Nathan Strejcek formerly of The Teen Idles and Youth Brigade
Skip Groff producer of Y&T Records and Limp Records
Don Zientara producer of Inner Ear Studios
Jeff Nelson formerly of The Teen Idles, Minor Threat, Three and co-founder of Dischord Records
Cynthia Connolly photographer
Kenny Inouye formerly of Marginal Man
J Mascis of Dinosaur Jr., formerly of Deep Wound
Jenny Toomey formerly of Tsunami, Grenadine and co-founder of Simple Machines Records
Mark Robinson formerly of Unrest and founder of TeenBeat Records
Scott Crawford filmmaker and journalist
Bubba DuPree formerly of Void
Jason Farrell of Swiz
Dody DiSanto co-founder of 9:30 Club
Fred Armisen actor, comedian and formerly of Trenchmouth
Brian Baker of Bad Religion, formerly of Minor Threat and Dag Nasty
John Stabb formerly of Government Issue
Boyd Farrell formerly of Black Market Baby
Mike Dolfi formerly of Black Market Baby
George Pelecanos novelist and screenwriter
Mark Haggerty formerly of Iron Cross and Gray Matter
Michael Hampton formerly of State of Alert, The Faith, Embrace and One Last Wish
Tom Berard scenester
Nicole Thomas formerly of Fire Party
Tom Sherwood reporter and author
Jessica Kane scenester
Andre "White Boy" Johnson of Rare Essence
Bobby Sullivan formerly of Soulside and Lunchmeat
Stuart Casson formerly of The Meatmen and Dove
Tim Kerr formerly of Big Boys
Steve Hansgen formerly of Minor Threat and Second Wind
Steve Niles formerly of Gray Matter and Three
Joey Aronstamm formerly of Holy Rollers
Onam Ben-Israel (formerly Tomas Squip) formerly of Red C, Beefeater and Fidelity Jones
Monica Richards formerly of Madhouse and Strange Boutique
Sharon Cheslow formerly of Chalk Circle and BMO
Amy Pickering formerly of Fire Party
Mark Andersen author and activist
Brendan Canty of Fugazi, formerly of Rites of Spring, One Last Wish and Happy Go Licky
Skeeter Thompson formerly of Scream
Tom Lyle formerly of Government Issue
J. Robbins of Office of Future Plans, formerly of Government Issue and Jawbox
Damon Locks formerly of Trenchmouth
Jon Jolles scenester
Jim Saah photographer and filmmaker
Meghan Adkins formerly of Special K
Geoff Turner formerly of Gray Matter
Chris Thomson formerly of Lunchmeat and Ignition
Scott McCloud formerly of Lunchmeat and Soulside
Dave Grohl of Foo Fighters, formerly of Scream and Nirvana
Chris Page formerly of Mission Impossible
Pete Stahl formerly of Scream
Franz Stahl formerly of Scream and Foo Fighters
Steve Polcari formerly of Marginal Man and Artificial Peace
Jim Spellman journalist and formerly of High Back Chairs and Velocity Girl
Andy Rapoport formerly of Kingface
Craig Wedren formerly of Shudder to Think
Kim Coletta formerly of Jawbox
Joe Lally of Fugazi

Soundtrack
Me and You - Egghunt
What a Boy Can't Do - Slickee Boys
Don't Bother Me - Bad Brains
Kill the Kids - Slinkees
Never Mind - White Boy
Pressure's On - Red C
Banned in DC - Bad Brains
Nic Fit - Untouchables
Its About Time We Had A Change - Youth Brigade
Teen Idles - Teen Idles
Teen Love - No Trend
Public Defender - SOA
Who Cares - Slinkees
All Ages Show - Dag Nasty
Gotta Tell Me Why - Slickee Boys
Repulsion - Madhouse
Death of a Friend - Double-O
Teenage Rebel - The Avengers
Suburban Wasteland - Artificial Peace
Building - Embrace
Bet You Never Thought - Scream
Came Without Warning - Scream
Baby - Soulside
DC Groove - Static Disruptors
Bang on the Drum - Scream
Throttle - Ignition
Flannery - Dain Bramage
Crawl - Kingface
Lie - Swiz
Summertime Train - Shudder to Think
Take it Back - Gray Matter
Straight Edge - Minor Threat
Who Are You - Void
Torn Apart - Marginal Man
Double Image - Marginal Man
Forever Gone - Marginal Man
Bulldog Front - Fugazi
Waiting Room - Fugazi
Into Your Shell - Mission Impossible
Aware - Faith
World at War - Black Market Baby
Youth Crimes - Black Market Baby
Caring Line - Government Issue
Jaded Eyes - Government Issue
Swann Street - 3
Freezer Burn - Jawbox
Funk Off - Big Boys
Salad Days - Minor Threat
I Could Puke - White Boy

References

Bibliography
 Crawford, Scott (2017). Spoke: Anecdotes and Images from the Film Salad Days: A Decade of Punk in Washington, DC, 1980–1990. Akashic Books. .

External links
 Official page
 
 
 

2014 films
American documentary films
Documentary films about punk music and musicians
Punk films
2010s English-language films
2010s American films